Reşat Muhlis Erkmen (1891 in Bursa – 27 June 1985 in Istanbul) was a Turkish farmer and politician.

Biography
He graduated from the Halkalı High School of Agriculture in Constantinople and got specialized in animal breeding and dairy farming in Berlin, Germany. He played a pioneering role in the establishment of the Ankara School of Agriculture and the Atatürk Forest Farm and Zoo. Mustafa Kemal Atatürk personally gave him the surname "Erkmen". 

In the summer of 1985, he died in his house in Istanbul.

Muhlis Erkmen was the Minister of Agriculture between 5 March 1931 and 11 June 1937 (7th and 8th government of Turkey) during İsmet İnönü governments and between 25 January and 9 July 1942 (11th and 12th government of Turkey during Refşik Saydam governments.

References 

1891 births
1985 deaths
People from Bursa
Republican People's Party (Turkey) politicians
Government ministers of Turkey
Date of birth missing
Members of the Grand National Assembly of Turkey
Turkish farmers
Founders of educational institutions